Events of 2019 in the European Union.

Incumbents 
 President of the European Council
 Donald Tusk (to 30 November 2019)
 Charles Michel (from 1 December 2019)
 Commission President
 Jean-Claude Juncker (to 30 November 2019)
 Ursula von der Leyen (from 1 December 2019)
 Council Presidency
 Romania (Jan – Jun 2019)
 Finland (July – Dec 2019)
 Parliament President 
 Antonio Tajani (to 3 July 2019) 
 David Sassoli (from 3 July 2019)
 High Representative
 Federica Mogherini (to 30 November 2019)
 Josep Borrell (from 1 December 2019)

Events

January 
 Heavy winter storms paralyzed parts of Scandinavia and the Alps, including northern Norway and Sweden, southern Germany, and Austria.
 European border agency Frontex estimated 150,000 people entered the EU through irregular crossings in 2018, a 92% drop from the peak recorded in 2015, mainly due to a dramatic drop in arrivals from Libya, Algeria, and Tunisia using the central Mediterranean route through Italy.

March 
 March 26 – The European Parliament votes by 348 to 278 in favour of the controversial Article 13 of the EU Directive on Copyright in the Digital Single Market, which expands legal liability for websites.

Deaths

References

 
Years of the 21st century in the European Union
2010s in the European Union